North Newark was a former commuter railroad train station in the Woodside section of the city of Newark, Essex County, New Jersey. Located at the intersection of Broadway and Verona Avenues, the station served trains on NJ Transit's Boonton Line, which operated at the time between Netcong and Hoboken Terminal. The station consisted of two low-level side platforms, accessible by stairs from Broadway. The next station to the east was Arlington in nearby Kearny, with the next station to the west being Rowe Street in Bloomfield. 

Railroad service through the Woodside section of Newark began on January 1, 1873 with the introduction of the Montclair Railway between Jersey City and Monks Castle in West Milford. Operation of the railroad changed hands multiple times, but in 1889, the Erie Railroad, which operated the line, built a depot on the platform. This new station was a combination passenger facility and residential dwelling. The station depot at North Newark burned in June 1970, but the firefighters rescued the canopy of the depot, which the railroad repurposed into the main facilities. NJ Transit continued operation of the station until April 26, 1986 when it was closed with the Grant Avenue stop in Plainfield on the Raritan Valley Line. There was also a Forest Hill station which was after North Newark station heading westbound. It was in the area of Manchester Pl near Verona Avenue.

Station layout

History
Railroad service through the Woodside section of Newark began to come together with the incorporation of the Montclair Railway on March 18, 1867 to build a railway from the Hudson River at Jersey City to the municipality of Montclair in Essex County. The railway opened on January 1, 1873, when the  railroad opened service from Jersey City to Monks Castle in West Milford. Two stations were established in the city of Newark, one at North Newark and one then known as Montgomery.

The railroad demolished the 1873-built station depot at North Newark in August 1889 for the construction of a new station depot on the site. The new station was a three-story wooden depot on the eastbound platform. This depot would include the waiting room and ticket office, along with a residential dwelling.

A trolley opened in July 1894 that connected rail service at North Newark station to the center of Newark at Broad and Market Streets as competition to the Delaware, Lackawanna and Western Railroad and its service at Broad Street Station. 

On November 29, 1962, it was announced that the Greenwood Lake Division and the former Delaware, Lackawanna and Western Railroad Boonton Branch would be merged together, operating service between Hoboken Terminal and Dover. Dwight R.G. Palmer, the Commissioner of the New Jersey State Highway Department, noted that North Newark station would benefit from the merge, opening access to those who commuted to jobs in Newark. On March 6, 1963, Palmer announced that new train schedules had been approved for the merged service. The new service began on October 27, 1963.

The 1889-built North Newark station depot caught fire in June 1970. The majority of the station was lost, save for the canopy overhanging the platform. The Erie Lackawanna Railroad repainted and repurposed the canopy for railroad service. The site of the depot would also be repurposed, but for a railroad transmission tower. 

On March 17, 1986, NJ Transit announced that they would discontinue service at the North Newark station on April 26 due to low ridership along with the Grant Avenue station in Plainfield, Union County.

Passenger service on the railroad ended on September 20, 2002 when NJ Transit prepared to open the Montclair Connection, which would tie the Boonton Line and the Montclair Branch together at Bay Street station. As a result, the three active stations were closed. After being used as a freight line, the state of New Jersey acquired an  stretch of the former Boonton Line at the cost of $65 million on August 19, 2022 for conversion of the railroad to a rail trail. The station site at North Newark, which used to have the two remaining platforms and overgrown tracks, has become openly replaced by expansion of a local junkyard.

Bibliography

References 

Former Erie Railroad stations
Former NJ Transit stations
1873 establishments in New Jersey
1986 disestablishments in New Jersey
Railway stations in the United States opened in 1873
Railway stations closed in 1986
Newark, New Jersey
Demolished railway stations in the United States
Former railway stations in New Jersey